The Corn da Tinizong (also known as Tinzenhorn) is a mountain of the Albula Alps, located between Savognin and Bergün, in the Swiss canton of Graubünden. Its large southern face overlooks the Pass digls Orgels.

References

External links

 Corn da Tinizong on Hikr

Mountains of the Alps
Alpine three-thousanders
Mountains of Switzerland
Mountains of Graubünden
Bergün Filisur